The 2011 South Dakota Coyotes football team represented the University of South Dakota in the 2011 NCAA Division I FCS football season. The Coyotes were led by eighth year head coach Ed Meierkort, played their home games at the DakotaDome, and they were members of the Great West Conference. This was South Dakota's final year as a member of the Great West as they became a member of The Summit League in 2012 and a football-only member of the Missouri Valley Football Conference.

They finished the season 6–5, 2–2 in Great West play to finish in third place.

Schedule

Roster

References

South Dakota
South Dakota Coyotes football seasons
South Dakota Coyotes football